Alejandro Fernández (born January 26, 1996) is a Colombian race car driver. He currently participates in the North American karting as well as the Red Bull Global Rallycross Championship in the class GRC Lites.

Career

His career in the world of motorsports began at age 16 when his family bought him his first Go-Kart as a birthday present. Two months later Fernández began to race in his first competitions in the United States.

Since 2012 he has raced in several championships. In 2012 he raced in championships like Challenge of the Americas, California Prokart Challenge, SKUSA Pro Tour, International Karting Federation (IKF), among others. The following year Alejandro competed in the Florida Winter Tour, U.S. Grand Nationals, Los Angeles Kart Championship (LAKC) as well as championships in his homeland, including the Rotax Max Challenge Colombia and La Carrera de las Estrella which was organized by Fundación Sonrisas in Medellín.

Fernández also ran in different classes of motorsports, such as the F2000, Mazda Pro, Rallycars, Trophy Trucks and Sportscars.

BMX
In his childhood Fernández raced BMX and competed in the ABA BMX World Championships in 2003. Due to a broken hand, he had to withdraw from the tracks.

In the United States he participated in championships such as the ABA (American Bicycle Association) and the NBL (National Bicycle League). In Colombia he raced “La Rueda de Oro”.

Buddy Rice Karting
Throughout his racing career Fernández has always been accompanied by Buddy Rice, a North American race car driver and owner of Buddy Rice Karting.

In 2014, Rice continued to accompany Fernández as his mentor in the GRC Lites Class.

Rallycross
In November 2013 he participated in a private test for the Global Rallycross Championship in Las Vegas. As a result of this opportunity Fernández was awarded a position in the championship in the GRC Lites Class.

In 2014, Fernández joined the Global Rallycross Championship, the first Colombian and Latin American driver in the series.

Career timeline

2012
 2012 Challenge of the Americas Senior Max
 2012 California ProKart Challenge Tag Sr
 2012 SKUSA ProTour Tag Sr
 2012 IKF Tag Sr
 2012 IKF PRD Sr
 2012 Tri-C Karters Championship
 2012 US Grand Rotax Nationals
 2012 LAKC Tag Sr
 2012 LAKC PRD Sr

2013
 2013 Challenge of the Americas Senior Max
 2013 California ProKart Challenge tag Sr
 2013 SKUSA ProTour Tag Sr
 2013 Florida Winter Tour Rotax Sr
 2013 Tri-C Grand Prix Rotax Sr
 2013 Tri-C Grand Prix Tag Sr
 2013 Tri-C karters Championship
 2013 US Grand Nationals
 2013 LAKC Tag Sr
 2013 LAKC PRD SR
 2013 PRD PAN-AM Crown of Karting 
 2013 Carrera de Las Estrellas. Medellín, Colombia.
 2013 Rotax Max Challenge Colombia

2014
 2014 Rotax Max Challenge Colombia Senior Max
 2014 Challenge of the Americas Senior Max
 2014 LAKC S2
 2014 LAKC Tag Sr
 2014 So-Cal Rotax Challenge Senior Max
 Redbull Global Rallycross, GRC Lites Class

Achievements
 LAKC 2012 Tag Senior Champion 
 LAKC 2013 Tag Senior Champion
 IKF 2013 PRD Senior National Champion
 Tri-C Grand Prix 2013 Rotax Senior Runner-up 
 3rd Tri-C Grand Prix 2013 Tag Senior
 3rd Nationals Championship IKF 2013 KPV4 
 3rd LAKC 2013 PRD Senior Championship
 3rd Challenge of The Americas 2013 Tucson, AZ 
 Top 18 U.S. Nationals Rotax 2013
 Top 25 of 91, SKUSA USA Tag Senior.

Racing record

Complete Global Rallycross Championship results
(key)

GRC Lites

References

Links 
 Official website Alejandro Fernández 
 Official Press Release Global Rallycross 2014
 Interview at Blu Radio. Bogotá, Colombia. December 2013
 Wikipedia en español de Alejandro Fernández

International Race of Champions drivers
24 Hours of Daytona drivers
Colombian people of Spanish descent
Living people
Sportspeople from Bogotá
1996 births